Lahor is a village in the Federally Administered Tribal Areas of Pakistan. It is located at 34°28'41N 71°17'27E with an altitude of 681 metres (2237 feet).

References

Populated places in Khyber Pakhtunkhwa